William Henry Caldecourt (28 September 1802 – 21 June 1857) was an English professional cricketer who played first-class cricket from 1821 to 1844.

A medium pace underarm bowler who was mainly associated with Cambridge Town Club and Marylebone Cricket Club (MCC), he made 42 known appearances in first-class matches.  He represented the Players in the Gentlemen v Players series and the South in the North v. South series.

References

1802 births
1857 deaths
English cricketers
English cricketers of 1787 to 1825
English cricketers of 1826 to 1863
Cambridge Town Club cricketers
Cambridge University cricketers
Hampshire cricketers
Kent cricketers
Marylebone Cricket Club cricketers
Non-international England cricketers
North v South cricketers
Players cricketers